Kitgum Airport  is an airport in Uganda. It is one of the 46 airports in the country.

Location
Kitgum Airport is in the town of Kitgum, in Kitgum District, Acholi sub-region, in the Northern Region of Uganda. It lies in the center of town, just west of the Kitgum-Lira Road.

Overview
Kitgum Airport is a small civilian airport that serves the town of Kitgum and the surrounding areas of Kitgum District.

See also
Transport in Uganda
List of airports in Uganda

References

External links
Uganda Civil Aviation Authority Homepage
Partial Listing of Airports In Uganda
OpenStreetMap - Kitgum Airport
SkyVector - Kitgum

Airports in Uganda
Kitgum District
Northern Region, Uganda